Boyce is an unincorporated community in South Fayette and Upper St. Clair townships, Allegheny County, Pennsylvania, United States.

References

Unincorporated communities in Allegheny County, Pennsylvania
Unincorporated communities in Pennsylvania